The current Pakistani High Commissioner to Sri Lanka is Shahzad Chaudhary, a former Air Vice Marshal. He succeeded Bashir Wali Mohammed, a retired army colonel.

References

 
Pakistan
Sri Lanka
Pakistan and the Commonwealth of Nations
Sri Lanka and the Commonwealth of Nations